Astravyets District – a district (rajon) in Grodno Region of Belarus.

The administrative center is Astravyets.

History 
1940, January 15 – established Astravyets district in the Vileika region.

1941, June 22 – Luftwaffe bombed the airfield in Mikhalishki.

1941, June 27 – district was occupied by German troops.

1944, July 3 – soviet partisans liberated Astravyets.

1944, July 7 – territory of the Astravyets district was completely liberated.

1944, September 9 – Astravyets district becomes part of Molodechno Region.

1960, January 20 – Astravyets district becomes part of Grodno Region.

1991, August 25 – district is becomes part of Republic of Belarus.

2007, June 14 — By the Decree of the President of the Republic of Belarus No. 279 the heraldic symbols of the town of Ostrovets and the Ostrovets district.

2011 — Beginning of construction of the  Belarusian nuclear power plant in the Ostrovets district.

2012 – Astravyets received the status of the city.

Administrative device 
Astravyets district is divided into 9 village soviets:
 Vornyansky village soviet
 Gherviatsky village soviet
 Gudogaysky village soviet
 Mihalishkovskiy village soviet
 Astravyets village soviet
 Podolsky village soviet
 Rytan village soviet
 Spondovo village soviet
 Trokenik village soviet

Notable residents 

 Adam Maldzis (1932, Rasoly village - 2022), Belarusian historian, literary critic and scholar

References

External links
 Ostrovets regional executive committee (Official site) 
 Нistory of Ostrovets District
 Newspaper "Ostrovetskaya Pravda" (Official site)

 
Districts of Grodno Region